"If You Believe'" is a song recorded by German singer Sasha. It was written by Grant Michael B., Pomez di Lorenzo and Pete Smith and produced by the former two for Sasha's debut studio album Dedicated to... (1998). His most successful release to date, it reached the top five in Austria, Flanders, Germany, Italy, the Netherlands and Switzerland and reached number 15 of the Swedish Singles Chart.

Credits and personnel 
Credits adapted from the liner notes of Dedicated to...

Music and lyrics – Pomez di Lorenzo, Grant Michael B.
Lead and backing vocals – Sasha
Mixing – Falk Moller, Michael B.

Charts

Weekly charts

Year-end charts

Certifications

References

External links 
 

1998 singles
1998 songs
Sasha (German singer) songs